James Callender Campbell (17 July 1838 – 9 February 1916) was an Australian politician, member of the Victorian Legislative Council for South Eastern Province from 1895 to 1910.

Campbell was born in Ballynagard, Derry, Ireland and was educated at Foyle College and Belfast Academy. In 1858 he sailed for Australia in the ship Royal Charter; his brothers having established a business – Campbell Brothers – some time before his arrival. Campbell entered into partnership with his brothers as merchants, importers and shipping agents until 1861 when he went to New Zealand and carried on the business of an importer and general merchant there till 1864 when he returned to Melbourne and in 1865 took the management of the auctioneering business of McCaw and another. In conjunction with William McCulloch he subsequently acquired the business, which for some years was carried on at the Royal Horse Bazaar under the style of McCulloch Campbell and Company. In 1868 J. M. Pratt became a partner and the business was transferred to Kirks Bazaar, Bourke street where it has been carried on ever since. McCulloch afterwards retired and the firm became Campbell Pratt and Company until 1887 when Pratt retired and Mr Campbell took his two sons into partnership under the title of Campbell and Sons.

In June 1895, Campbell was elected to the Victorian Legislative Council for South Eastern Province, a position he held until around January 1910.

Campbell died at his residence "Myrtle Grove", North Road, Brighton, Victoria, on 9 February 1916.

References

Members of the Victorian Legislative Council
1838 births
1916 deaths
Businesspeople from Derry (city)
Irish emigrants to colonial Australia